46th Street & 46th Avenue is a bus rapid transit station on the Metro A Line in Minneapolis, Minnesota.

The station is located at the intersection of 46th Avenue on 46th Street. Both station platforms are located west of 46th Avenue.

The station opened June 11, 2016 with the rest of the A Line.

Bus connections
 Route 23 - Uptown - 38th Street - Highland Village
 Route 46 - 50th Street - 46th Street - 46th Street Station - Highland Village
 Route 74 - 46th Street Station - Randolph Avenue - West 7th Street - East 7th Street - Sunray Transit Center
Connections to local bus Route 23 can be made on 46th Avenue. Routes 46 and 74 share platforms with the A Line.

Notable places nearby
Grand Rounds Scenic Byway
Intercity Bridge
Lock and Dam No. 1
Minnehaha Park
Minnesota Veterans Home
Mississippi National River and Recreation Area
Hiawatha, Minneapolis

References

External links 
 Metro Transit: 46th Street & 46th Avenue Station

Bus stations in Minnesota
2016 establishments in Minnesota